Laxmi Kanta Chawla is a former cabinet minister from Punjab government and a member of Bharatiya Janata Party (BJP). She was a college lecturer before becoming the minister. She is the National Vice President of the Bharatiya Janata Party. She had health portfolio earlier and later social welfare portfolio in 2010. She was elected to state legislative assembly from Amritsar in 2007 and is an ex-MLA.

References 

Living people
Members of the Punjab Legislative Assembly
Punjabi people
Politicians from Amritsar
State cabinet ministers of Punjab, India
21st-century Indian women politicians
21st-century Indian politicians
Bharatiya Janata Party politicians from Punjab
Women state cabinet ministers of India
Year of birth missing (living people)
People from Amritsar district
People from Amritsar
Women members of the Punjab Legislative Assembly